Keith Smith  was an American football coach.  He was the 14th head football coach at Eastern Illinois State College—now known as Eastern Illinois University—in Charleston, Illinois, serving for one season, in 1956, and compiling a record of 2–7.

Head coaching record

References

Year of birth missing
Year of death missing
Eastern Illinois Panthers football coaches